De Hûnekop is a four-piece band from the Dutch province Friesland. The band performs in the West Frisian language and is very popular regionally. The band is active since the year 2009, when the band was formed in Ljouwert. It has won the Fryslân Pop Talent Award in the year 2010.

Discography 
 2010: It raast oan de protters 
 2011: Wanklanken fan 'e wurkflier
 2012: Psalms foar de rûchhouwer
 2014: Fiif jier smoar
 2016: Klompetreen
 2019: Monsterachtich

References

External links 
Official website
De Hûnekop on Myspace

Music in Friesland
West Frisian language